HR 515 is a variable star in the zodiac constellation of Pisces, near the eastern constellation border with Aries. Before the constellation borders were officially set, it held the Flamsteed designation of 3  Arietis, abbreviated 3 Ari). This star has the variable star designation VY Piscium, or VY Psc for short. It is a white-hued star that is near the lower limit of visibility to the naked eye with an apparent visual magnitude that ranges from 6.54 down to 6.59. Parallax measurements provide a distance estimate of approximately 570 light years from the Sun.

Gray and associates (1989) found a stellar classification of A8 III for this object, matching an evolved A-type giant star. Abt and Morrell (1995) listed a class of F0V, suggesting it is an F-type main-sequence star. It is a Delta Scuti variable whose brightness varies between magnitudes 6.54 and 6.59 with a period of 0.219 days. The star shows a high rate of spin with a projected rotational velocity of 96 km/s. It has 4.8 times the girth of the Sun and is radiating 58 times the Sun's luminosity from its photosphere at an effective temperature of 7,253 K.

References

A-type giants
F-type main-sequence stars
Delta Scuti variables

Pisces (constellation)
Durchmusterung objects
Arietis, 03
010845
008271
0515
Piscium, VY